Megadermatidae, or false vampire bats, are a family of bats found from central Africa, eastwards through southern Asia, and into Australia. They are relatively large bats, ranging from 6.5 cm to 14 cm in head-body length. They have large eyes, very large ears and a prominent nose-leaf. They have a wide membrane between the hind legs, or uropatagium, but no tail. Many species are a drab brown in color, but some are white, bluish-grey or even olive-green, helping to camouflage them against their preferred roosting environments. They are primarily insectivorous, but will also eat a wide range of small vertebrates.

Description
They all lack tails.
The ghost bat is the largest member of the family.
All the species have very large ears with divided tragi.
They have long nose-leaves.
All species are similar in that they lack upper incisors, though not all species have the same dental formulae.

Biology and ecology
These species are collectively called false vampire due to the old misconception that they were sanguivorous like the true vampire bats.
The ghost bat, heart-nosed bat, lesser false vampire bat, and greater false vampire bat feed on insects and small vertebrates; the yellow-winged bat and Thongaree's disc-nosed bat are likely fully insectivorous.
The heart-nosed bat, greater false vampire bat, and the ghost bat are three of the few bat-eating bats in the world.
All species of this family are nocturnal, with the exception of the yellow-winged bat which is sometimes active in daylight.

Systematics

Megadermatidae is a family within the Rhinolophoidea superfamily.
Genetic analysis shows that it is the most basal member of the superfamily.
It is a monophyletic family of bats, based on genetic analysis.

There is confusion about the relationship of species within Megadermatidae.
A 2015 study concluded that, while they did not have enough genetic data to fully resolve these relationships, the two Megaderma species should be in separate genera.
The authors of the 2015 paper suggested that the greater false vampire bat, Megaderma lyra, should be renamed as Lyroderma lyra.
The recovered cladogram in the 2015 study had relatively low posterior probabilities, however, underscoring the need for future study to achieve higher resolution.
Note that Thongaree's disc-nosed bat, Eudiscoderma thongareeae, was not included in this analysis, as it was not described as a new species until 2015.

Fossil record
Megadermatidae is a relatively old family, appearing in the fossil record as early as 37 million years ago.
Several fossil species have been described, including:

 Macroderma koppa Hand, Dawson & Augee, 1988. a fossil species that existed in the Pliocene epoch.
 Macroderma godthelpi, Hand, 1985. the earliest and smallest species
 Macroderma malugara Hand, 1996.
Megaderma brailloni: Discovered in France; dated from the early Eocene.
Megaderma gaillardi: Discovered in France; dated from the mid-Miocene.
Megaderma lugdunensis: Discovered in France and the Czech Republic; dated from the mid-Miocene.
Megaderma jaegeri: Discovered in Morocco; dated from the mid-Miocene
Megaderma vireti: Discovered in Lissieu, France; dated from the late Miocene.
Megaderma mediterraneum: Discovered in France; dated from the late Pliocene.
Megaderma janossyi: Discovered in Hungary; dated from the early Pliocene.
Megaderma watwat: Discovered in Palestine; dated from the Pleistocene.

Conservation
All Megadermatidae species are evaluated as least concern by the IUCN with the exception of the ghost bat, which is vulnerable, and Thongaree's disc-nosed bat, which is critically endangered.

Classification

A list of extant species includes,

Family Megadermatidae
Genus Cardioderma
Heart-nosed bat, Cardioderma cor
Genus Lavia
Yellow-winged bat, Lavia frons
Genus Macroderma
Ghost bat, Macroderma gigas
Genus Megaderma
Lesser false vampire bat, Megaderma spasma
Greater false vampire bat, Megaderma lyra
Genus Eudiscoderma
Thongaree's disc-nosed bat, Eudiscoderma thongareeae

References

External links
 Megadermatidae

 
Bat families
Extant Rupelian first appearances
Taxa named by Harrison Allen